Victor Leydet (1861–1904) was a French genre painter.

Biography
Victor Leydet was born on July 21, 1861 in L'Isle-sur-la-Sorgue. He was trained as a painter at the École des beaux-arts d'Avignon, now known as the École supérieure d'art d'Avignon in Avignon, where painter Pierre Grivolas (1823-1906) was his teacher. He was also trained by painters Gabriel Bourges and Jean-Léon Gérôme (1824-1904).

As a professional painter, he was a member of the New School of Avignon. His painting entitled Femmes en prières is exhibited in the Musée d'Orsay in Paris. Some of his other paintings, like Portrait du jeune homme, en pied or Avant la messe, can be seen in the Musée Calvet in Avignon.

He was a member of the Académie de Vaucluse.

He died on October 20, 1904 in Sorgues.

Selected works

Secondary source
Victor Leydet, peintre du 19e: 1861 - L'Isle-sur-la-Sorgue (Campredon art et culture (L'Isle-sur-la-Sorgue, Vaucluse), 1985, 47 pages).

References

People from Vaucluse
1861 births
1904 deaths
19th-century French painters
French male painters
19th-century French male artists